Laura Eugenia Bennett (born August 2, 1963) is an American architect and fashion designer and one of the four finalists on Bravo's July 2006's Project Runway (Season 3).

Biography
Bennett was born in New Orleans, Louisiana. She received her undergraduate degree in architecture from the University of Houston and a graduate degree in the same field from Columbia University in New York City.

Bennett has six children: one daughter Cleo (born 1988), from her first marriage, and five sons: Peik (born 1996), Truman (born 1999), Pierson (born 2002), Larson (born 2003), and Finn (born Dec 1, 2006), whom she discovered she was pregnant with while competing on Project Runway, with her late husband, architect Peter L. Shelton. On August 26, 2012, Shelton died of cancer in their New York home.  Shelton's work as a co-founder of Shelton, Mindel & Associates, and a memorial to him was in the November 2012 issue of Architectural Digest.

She worked part-time at his design firm, Shelton, Mindel & Associates, best known for its design of the Polo Ralph Lauren headquarters in New York City.  In 2013, Bennett (re-styled as Laura Bennett Shelton) relocated her family and business to the Laros estate in Bethlehem, PA. The house is on a property originally belonging to her husband's maternal grandfather, prominent early 20th century businessman and textile manufacturer R.K. Laros. She serves as Vice Chair of the R.K. Laros Foundation. After her relocation to Pennsylvania, Bennett Shelton took up archery, and within six months was competing at a world-class level, even participating in the 2014 World Indoor Archery Championships.

Project Runway
Her designs for Project Runway tended to be mostly elegant evening wear, and on more than one occasion, despite agreeing that she had a very glamorous, definitive point of view, the judges expressed their concerns that she was aiming strictly for an older market, although she did win one of the weekly challenges. She was also known for completing her garments in short amounts of time. Tim Gunn has joked on her speed often in his podcasts.

In the next-to-last episode, while preparing for Olympus Fashion Week, she accused fellow finalist Jeffrey Sebelia of hiring outside help to complete his line (which Mychael and Uli had also raised concerns about).  After an investigation by Bravo producers, no substantial proof was found for Bennett's claim and Sebelia continued in the competition. Bennett ultimately was the second runner-up after Uli; Sebelia was the winner.

Post-Project Runway design career
In February 2008, she debuted her LBD collection on QVC.

Author
After her appearance on Project Runway, Bennett started writing for the Web site The Daily Beast. Her article topics ranged from family life with her six children to fashion on the red carpet and a wide range of other topics. Her 2010 book, Didn't I Feed You Yesterday? A Mother's Guide to Sanity in Stilettos, was published by Random House, followed in 2012 by Handmade Chic: Fashionable Projects That Look High-End, Not Homespun, published by Rodale.

References

External links

1963 births
American fashion designers
American women fashion designers
American women architects
Project Runway (American series) participants
Architects from New Orleans
Living people
University of Houston alumni
Columbia Graduate School of Architecture, Planning and Preservation alumni
21st-century American women